French was the designation of a particular type of military jacket or tunic in the Russian Empire and later in the Union of Soviet Socialist Republics (USSR).

In the years immediately preceding the start of World War I, several new models of khaki-grey uniform jackets were adopted in Russia for service wear by Imperial Army officers. In most cases these were related to (and influenced by) the latest creations in the armies of France and the United Kingdom. These loose-fitting and practical garments received the collective designation french in tribute to the supreme commander of the British Expeditionary Force to France, field marshal John French.

The main features of the french were as follows: 
 soft collar – turndown version or standing version with button fastening,
 variable half-belt and changeable sleeves
 four big pockets (appliquéd, with buttons) with flaps (two upper chest, two below).

In the Red Army of the Soviet Union it was usually worn by commanding officers, chiefs and political officers and from 1924 to 1943.

In the air force there was a limited number of frenches regularly worn by British officers. It was characterised by an open collar, to be worn with tie or scarf.

Evolution to the Stalin tunic
The French tunic eventually evolved in the 1920s to the Stalin tunic, which was adopted by several political leaders, such as Joseph Stalin.

References
 Френч. // Крысин Л.П. Толковый словарь иноязычных слов. — Эксмо, 2008. — 944 с.

See also
 Military uniform
 List of Russian inventions

19th-century fashion
20th-century fashion
Uniforms
Military uniforms
Russian clothing